The rivière du Milieu (English: river of the middle) is a tributary of Poutrincourt Lake, flowing into the unorganized territory of Lac-Ashuapmushuan, Quebec, into the Regional County Municipality (RCM) of Le Domaine-du-Roy, in the administrative region of Saguenay-Lac-Saint-Jean, Quebec, Canada.

The Milieu River runs successively in the townships of Buade and Poutrincourt. Forestry is the main economic activity of this valley; recreational tourism activities, second.

Forest Road R0212 (East-West) intersects the middle of the river. While the forest road R0223 serves the Valley of the Marquette River West, on the west side of Poutrincourt Lake. This last road connects to the Northeast at route 167 linking Chibougamau and Saint-Félicien, Quebec. The Canadian National Railway runs along this road.

The surface of the Milieu River is usually frozen from early November to mid-May, however, safe ice circulation is generally from mid-November to mid-April.

Geography

Toponymy 
The toponym "Rivière du milieu" was formalized on March 28, 1972, at the Commission de toponymie du Québec.

Notes and references

See also 

Rivers of Saguenay–Lac-Saint-Jean
Le Domaine-du-Roy Regional County Municipality